Series 30 of Top Gear, a British motoring magazine and factual television programme, was broadcast in the United Kingdom on BBC One and BBC One HD during early 2021. It was the fourth series to feature the presenting lineup of Chris Harris, Paddy McGuinness, and Freddie Flintoff, and the second to be broadcast on BBC One. As with the previous series, the COVID-19 pandemic affected production and filming of this series, with several changes made as a result; studio segments were filmed on an outdoor set with no full audience.

Production 
On 28 February 2021, it was announced that, due to restrictions as a result of the COVID-19 pandemic, filming of the studio links for the thirtieth series would not be taking place at its usual location at Dunsfold Aerodrome, and there would not be a studio audience present; the number of episodes in the series was also reduced to four. Instead, the links for the show were recorded during a two-night shoot outside Television Centre, London with no full audience present. Unlike during the previous series, the presenters and crew members did not need to be physically distanced during filming as they were "bubbled" and tested during filming.

Episodes

A Tribute To Sabine Schmitz
Former presenter Sabine Schmitz died from cancer on 16 March 2021, two days after the first episode of the series was aired; following the broadcast of the final episode of the series on 4 April 2021, a special tribute to her was made available on BBC iPlayer. The tribute, which was shown on BBC One on 7 April 2021 and features clips from Schmitz's appearances on Top Gear, was narrated by Zoe Ball and contains contributions from some of the current and former presenters of the show (these are Jeremy Clarkson, Richard Hammond, James May, Matt LeBlanc, Rory Reid, Chris Harris, Paddy McGuinness, and Freddie Flintoff), as well as several other figures from the world of motorsport.

Notes

References

External links
 Series 30 at the Internet Movie Database

2021 British television seasons
Top Gear seasons